O Rico e Lázaro (English: The Rich and Lazarus) is a Brazilian telenovela produced by Casablanca and broadcast by RecordTV. Created by Paula Richard. It premiered on March 23, 2017 and ended on November 20, 2017. It stars Milena Toscano, Dudu Azevedo, and Igor Rickli.

The telenovela tells the story of the parable Rich man and Lazarus taking place at the time of Babylonian Captivity.

Plot 
After the death of Joshua, the Hebrew people begin to "go their own way", turning their backs on God and beginning to worship pagan gods. But when the prophet Jeremiah tries to warn them, his own people try to stone him, calling him a traitor and false prophet, but his prophecy is fulfilled with the arrival of King Nebuchadnezzar II and his wife Queen Amytis. And in another part of the story involves the love triangle involving Joana, Zac, and Asher, who at the beginning of the novel were childhood friends, but over time the trio is growing and Zac and Asher fall in love with Joana, but she corresponds only to Asher.

Cast 
 Milena Toscano as Joana
 Dudu Azevedo as Lazarus/Asher
 Igor Rickli as Zac
 Christine Fernandes as Sammu-Ramat
 Sthefany Brito as Nitocris
 Ângelo Paes Leme as Nebuzaradã
 Adriana Garambone as Amytis
 Heitor Martinez as Nebuchadnezzar II
 Denise Del Vecchio as Elga
 Lucinha Lins as Zelfa
 Paulo Figueiredo as Zadoque
 Zé Carlos Machado as Fassur
 Vera Zimmermann as Neusta
 Cássio Scapin as Berossus
 Gabriel Gracindo as Daniel
 Roger Gobeth as Absalom
 Gabriela Moreyra as Shamiran
 Cássia Linhares as Shag-Shag
 Tammy di Calafiori as Lia
 Marcos Breda as Ravina
 Cláudia Mauro as Ilana
 Pérola Faria as Kassaia
 Henri Pagnoncelli as Chaim
 Osmar Silveira as Jehoiachin
 Augusto Garcia as Nabonidus
 Kayky Brito as Amel-Marduk
 Anderson Müller as Tamir
 Renato Rabello as Shamir
 Michelle Batista as Talita
 Giselle Batista as Samira
 Gustavo Leão as Rabe-Sáris
 Felipe Cardoso as Arioch
 Bruna Pazinato as Rebeca
 Graziella Schmitt as Dana
 Sacha Bali as Meshach
 Licurgo Spínola as Ezekiel
 Aisha Jambo as Gadise
 Gustavo Rodrigues as Shadrach
 Rafael Almeida as Hurzabum
Guilherme Seta as Hurzabum child
 Robertha Portella as Edissa
 André Luiz Miranda as Ebede-Meleque
 Eduardo Melo as Lior
 Karen Marinho as Naomi
 Juliana Kelling as Dalila
 Mariza Marchetti as Malca
 Fernando Sampaio as Matias
 Raphael Montagner as Nicolau
 Paula Jubé as Raquel
 Ricardo Martins as Larsa
 Keff Oliveira as Anjo Gabriel
 Nikolas Antunes as Abednego
 Ana Zettel as Darice
 João Velho as Madai
 Paulo Leal as Rafael
 Karla Tenório as Jade
 Rafaela Ferreira as Hayddé
 César Pezzuoli as Zabaia
 Ed Oliveira as Rato
 Pedro Malta as Tamuz
 Fran Fischer as Namnu
 Saulo Meneghetti as Oziel
 Saulo Rodrigues as Aspenaz
 Edson Fieschi as Erom
 Thogun Teixeira as Sargão
 Marcelo Arnal as Belshazzar
 Rafael Awi as Benjamin
 Breno di Filippo as Rei Dario
 Ana Paula Lima as Yasha
 Alex Brasil as Aksumai
 William Amaral as Joel
 Tião D'Ávila as Aliatis
 Rafael Sieg as Levi
 Karize Brum as Kidist

Ratings

References

External links 

2017 telenovelas
Brazilian telenovelas
RecordTV telenovelas
Television series based on the Bible
2017 Brazilian television series debuts
2017 Brazilian television series endings
Portuguese-language telenovelas
Cultural depictions of Nebuchadnezzar II